United Nations Security Council resolution 1091, adopted without a vote at a closed meeting on 13 December 1996, the Council acknowledged the contributions of the outgoing Secretary-General, Boutros Boutros-Ghali, whose term would expire on 31 December 1996.

The Security Council recognised the role that Boutros-Ghali played in guiding the United Nations in the discharge of its responsibilities under the United Nations Charter. It also noted his efforts to find lasting solutions to conflicts around the world and commended the reforms he made in restructuring and strengthening the United Nations system.

The resolution acknowledge the contribution Boutros-Ghali had made to international peace and security, efforts to solve international problems, endeavours to meet humanitarian needs and his promotion of human rights and fundamental freedoms for all people. It concluded by expressing appreciation for his dedication to the provisions of the United Nations Charter and the development of friendly relations among countries.

It was the second time that a Security Council resolution had been adopted by acclamation.

See also
 List of United Nations Security Council Resolutions 1001 to 1100 (1995–1997)

References

External links
 
Text of the Resolution at undocs.org

 1091
 1091
December 1996 events